Steenbeck is surname of:
 Max Christian Theodor Steenbeck (1904, Kiel – 1981, East Berlin), German physicist
 Wilhelm Steenbeck (1896–1975), German engineer
 Steenbeck, a brand name

See also 
 Stenbeck
 
 Steinbeck
 Steinbach
 Steinbacher

Low German surnames
Toponymic surnames